The 2021 Portugal Ladies Open was a professional women's tennis tournament played on outdoor hard courts. It was the second edition of the tournament which was part of the 2021 ITF Women's World Tennis Tour. It took place in Caldas da Rainha, Portugal between 13 and 19 September 2021.

Singles main-draw entrants

Seeds

 1 Rankings are as of 30 August 2021.

Other entrants
The following players received wildcards into the singles main draw:
  Francisca Jorge
  Inês Murta
  Sara Lança
  Dalila Spiteri

The following player received entry using a junior exempt:
  Daria Snigur

The following player received entry using a special exempt:
  Anastasia Kulikova

The following players received entry from the qualifying draw:
  Elena Bogdan
  Salma Djoubri
  Weronika Falkowska
  Olivia Gadecki
  Ioana Loredana Roșca
  Sarah-Rebecca Sekulic
  Raluca Șerban
  Eden Silva

Champions

Singles

 Zheng Saisai def.  Harmony Tan, 6–4, 3–6, 6–3

Doubles

   Momoko Kobori /  Hiroko Kuwata def.  Alicia Barnett /  Olivia Nicholls, 7–6(7–5), 7–6(7–2)

References

External links
 2021 Portugal Ladies Open at ITFtennis.com
 Official website

2021 ITF Women's World Tennis Tour
2021 in Portuguese tennis
September 2021 sports events in Portugal